Ashot A. Melkonyan (born 16 February 1961 in Akhalkalak, Javakhk, Georgian SSR) is Doctor of History, Professor, Academician of Academy of Sciences of Armenia. Since 2002 he is the Director of the Institute of History of National Academy of Sciences of Armenia.

Biography
He finished the Faculty of History of the Yerevan State University in 1982, and received his PhD in history at YSU in 1989.  
From 2002 to present he is a Lecturer of the Chair of History of Armenia at the Yerevan State University. 

Melkonyan is an author of historical studies (including monographs and over 350 articles). The works are devoted mainly to the history of the Western Armenia, the Armenian genocide, Javakhk, the Armenian-Georgian relations, the historical demography of Armenia.
 
He is a member of the association of historians of the EENI countries.

Awards
 Andranik Ozanyan medal (2013), 
 Movses Khorenatsi medal (2003). 
 "Haykashen Uzunyan" Prize of Tekeyan Cultural Union (for his "Javakhk in the 19th Century and the 1st Quarter of the 20th Century" monography, 2004).
 Prize of Armenia Fund (for his "Erzerum" monography, 1994).
 Honorary citizen of Akhalkalak (2009).

Bibliography

in English
 Javakhk in the 19th Century and the 1st Quarter of the 20th Century (A Historical Research), Yerevan, 2007, 256 pages.

References

External links
Ashot Melkonyan's biography

Ethnic Armenian historians
1961 births
People from Samtskhe–Javakheti
Georgian people of Armenian descent
20th-century historians from Georgia (country)
Living people
21st-century historians from Georgia (country)